Park Joo-min (born 21 November 1973) is a South Korean politician in the liberal Democratic Party of Korea and has been a member of the National Assembly for Seoul Eunpyeong A since 2016.

Electoral history

References

External links
 
 

1973 births
Living people
Members of the National Assembly (South Korea)
Minjoo Party of Korea politicians
People from Seoul
Seoul National University alumni